A police state describes a state whose government institutions exercise an extreme level of control over civil society and liberties. There is typically little or no distinction between the law and the exercise of political power by the executive, and the deployment of internal security and police forces play a heightened role in governance. A police state is a characteristic of authoritarian, totalitarian or illiberal regimes (contrary to a liberal democratic regime). Such governments are typically one-party states, but police-state-level control may emerge in multi-party systems as well.

Originally, a police state was a state regulated by a civil administration, but since the beginning of the 20th century it has "taken on an emotional and derogatory meaning" by describing an undesirable state of living characterized by the overbearing presence of civil authorities. The inhabitants of a police state may experience restrictions on their mobility, or on their freedom to express or communicate political or other views, which are subject to police monitoring or enforcement. Political control may be exerted by means of a secret police force that operates outside the boundaries normally imposed by a constitutional state. Robert von Mohl, who first introduced the rule of law to German jurisprudence, contrasted the Rechtsstaat ("legal" or "constitutional" state) with the anti-aristocratic Polizeistaat ("police state").

History of usage 
The Oxford English Dictionary traces the phrase "police state" back to 1851, when it was used in reference to the use of a national police force to maintain order in the Austrian Empire. The German term Polizeistaat came into English usage in the 1930s with reference to totalitarian governments that had begun to emerge in Europe.

Because there are different political perspectives as to what an appropriate balance is between individual freedom and national security, there are no objective standards defining a police state. This concept can be viewed as a balance or scale. Along this spectrum, any law that has the effect of removing liberty is seen as moving towards a police state while any law that limits government oversight of the populace is seen as moving towards a free state.

An electronic police state is one in which the government aggressively uses electronic technologies to record, organize, search and distribute forensic evidence against its citizens.

Examples of states with related attributes 

Early forms of police states can be found in ancient China. During the rule King Li of Zhou in the 9th century BC, there was strict censorship, extensive state surveillance, and frequent executions of those who were perceived to be speaking against the regime. During this reign of terror, ordinary people did not dare to speak to each other on the street, and only made eye contacts with friends as a greeting, hence known as '道路以目'. Subsequently, during the short-lived Qin Dynasty, the police state became far more wide-reaching than its predecessors. In addition to strict censorship and the burning of all political and philosophical books, the state implemented strict control over its population by using collective executions and by disarming the population. Residents were grouped into units of 10 households, with weapons were strictly prohibited, and only one kitchen knife was allowed for 10 households. Spying and snitching was in common place, and failure to report any anti-regime activities was treated the same as if the person participated in it. If one person committed any crime against the regime, all 10 households would be executed.

Some have characterised the rule of King Henry VIII during the Tudor period as a police state. The Oprichnina established by Tsar Ivan IV within the Russian Tsardom in 1565 functioned as a predecessor to the modern police state, featuring persecutions and autocratic rule.

Nazi Germany emerged from an originally democratic government, yet gradually exerted more and more repressive controls over its people in the lead-up to World War II. In addition to the SS and the Gestapo, the Nazi police state used the judiciary to assert control over the population from the 1930s until the end of the war in 1945.

During the period of apartheid, South Africa maintained police-state attributes such as banning people and organizations, arresting political prisoners, maintaining segregated living communities and restricting movement and access.

Augusto Pinochet's Chile operated as a police state, exhibiting "repression of public liberties, the elimination of political exchange, limiting freedom of speech, abolishing the right to strike, freezing wages".

The Republic of Cuba under President (and later right-wing dictator) Fulgencio Batista was an authoritarian police state until his overthrow during the Cuban Revolution in 1959 with the rise to power of Fidel Castro and foundation of a Marxist-Leninist republic.

Following the failed July 1958 Haitian coup d'état attempt to overthrow the president, Haiti descended into an autocratic and despotic family dictatorship under the Haitian Vodou black nationalist François Duvalier (Papa Doc) and his National Unity Party. In 1959, Papa Doc ordered the creation of Tonton Macoutes, a paramilitary force unit whom he authorized to commit systematic violence and human rights abuses to suppress political opposition, including an unknown number of murders, public executions, rapes, disappearances of and attacks on dissidents; an unrestrained state terrorism. In the 1964 Haitian constitutional referendum, he declared himself the president for life through a sham election. After Duvalier's death in 1971, his son Jean-Claude (Baby Doc) succeeded him as the next president for life, continuing the regime until the popular uprising that had him overthrown in February 1986.

Ba'athist Syria under the dictatorship of Bashar al-Assad has been described as the most "ruthless police state" in the Arab World; with a tight system of restrictions on the movement of civilians, independent journalists and other unauthorized individuals. Alongside North Korea and Eritrea, it operates one of the strictest censorship machines that regulate the transfer of information. The Syrian security apparatus was established in the 1970s by Hafez al-Assad who ran a military dictatorship; with Ba'ath party as its civilian cover to enforce the loyalty of Syrian populations to Assad family. The dreaded Mukhabarat was given free hand to terrorise, torture or murder non-compliant civilians; while public activities of any organized opposition was curbed down with the raw firepower of the army. 

The region of modern-day North Korea is claimed to have elements of a police state, from the Juche-style Silla kingdom, to the imposition of a fascist police state by the Japanese, to the totalitarian police state imposed and maintained by the Kim family. Paris-based Reporters Without Borders has ranked North Korea last or second last in their test of press freedom since the Press Freedom Index's introduction, stating that the ruling Kim family control all of the media.

In response to government proposals to enact new security measures to curb protests, the government of the Justice and Development Party has been accused of turning Turkey into a police state. Since the 2013 Egyptian coup d'état, the military government of Egypt is said to have taken several steps to crack down on freedom of religion and expression with the intention of decreasing religious extremism, leading to accusations that it has effectively become a "Revolutionary Police State".

The dictatorship of Ferdinand Marcos from the 1970s to early 1980s in the Philippines has many characteristics of a police state.

USSR was described as the largest police state in history; modern-day Russia and Belarus are often described as police states.

Hong Kong is perceived to have implemented the tools of a police state after passing the National Security legislation in 2020, following repeated attempts by People's Republic of China to erode the rule of law in the former British colony.

Fictional police states 

Fictional police states have featured in media ranging from novels to films to video games. George Orwell's novel 1984 was described by The Encyclopedia of Police Science as "the definitive fictional treatment of a police state, which has also influenced contemporary usage of the term".

Orwell's novel describes Britain under the totalitarian Oceanian regime that continuously invokes (and helps to cause) a perpetual war. This perpetual war is used as a pretext for subjecting the people to mass surveillance and invasive police searches. The novel has been described as "the definitive fictional treatment of a police state, which has also influenced contemporary usage of the term".

See also 

 Arbitrary arrest and detention
 Counterintelligence state
 Dictatorship
 État légal (French)
 Government
 Kangaroo court
 Legal abuse
 List of countries by incarceration rate
 Martial law, the suspension of normal civil law during periods of emergency
 Mass surveillance
 Military dictatorship
 Nanny state
 Rechtsstaat (German)
 Secret police
 Surveillance state

References

External links 

 Amnesty International, 2005—annual report on human rights violations
 Council for Secular Humanism article describing attributes of police states
 David Mery (22 September 2005) "Suspicious behaviour on the tube". The Guardian—example of "police state" defined in a modern context
 Police State USA—a continuously updated multi-contributor site with news articles that document police brutality in the United States
 The Rutherford Institute "John W. Whitehead to Speak to Senior Statesmen of Virginia on the Emerging American Police State and What 2014 Holds in Store for Our Freedoms"
 Our Ever-Deadlier Police State. Chris Hedges on the police state in the United States.

1850s neologisms
Authoritarianism
Forms of government
Law enforcement
Militarism
Political science terminology